Fawn Township is the name of some places in the U.S. state of Pennsylvania:
Fawn Township, Allegheny County, Pennsylvania
Fawn Township, York County, Pennsylvania

Pennsylvania township disambiguation pages